The London Victory Parade of 1815 was a British victory parade held after the defeat of Napoleon in the Napoleonic Wars and his exile to Elba. The parade took place on 20 June  1815 at Hyde Park in London.

Over 15,000 troops attended the parade, most of them British. Other groups in attendance included Cossacks, Highlanders (who were an independent regiment at the time), and other small continental contingents.

See also
Napoleonic Wars

References

London Victory Parade of 1815
Regency London
1815 in England
Victory parades
Parades in London
1815 in military history
1815 in London
June 1815 events
Military parades in the United Kingdom